Tokyo Juliet may refer to:
 Tokyo Juliet (manga), a Japanese manga series
 Tokyo Juliet (TV series), a Taiwanese television series based on the manga
 Tokyo Juliet Original Soundtrack, the soundtrack for the television series